When a Guitar Plays the Blues may refer to:

 When a Guitar Plays the Blues (Roy Buchanan album), 1985
 When a Guitar Plays the Blues (Roy Lee Johnson album), 1998